The 2022–23 North Carolina Central Eagles men's basketball team represents North Carolina Central University in the 2022–23 NCAA Division I men's basketball season. The Eagles, led by 14th-year head coach LeVelle Moton, play their home games at McDougald–McLendon Arena in Durham, North Carolina as members of the Mid-Eastern Athletic Conference.

Previous season
The Eagles finished the 2021–22 season 16–15, 8–5 in MEAC play to finish in third place. They defeated Maryland Eastern Shore in the quarterfinals of the MEAC tournament, before being upset by #7 seed Coppin State in the semifinals.

Roster

Schedule and results

|-
!colspan=12 style=| Non-conference regular season

|-
!colspan=12 style=| MEAC regular season

|-
!colspan=9 style=| MEAC tournament

Sources

References

North Carolina Central Eagles men's basketball seasons
North Carolina Central Eagles
North Carolina Central Eagles men's basketball
North Carolina Central Eagles men's basketball